Carl E. Hulse (born October 19, 1954) is the chief Washington correspondent for The New York Times and managing editor of First Draft, a political news stream and morning email newsletter.  His regular New York Times column "On Washington", described developments in Washington DC.  His writing has also appeared online with MSN, MSN UK, MSN Canada, and CNBC, and in the Sydney Morning Herald, Albany Business Review, Boston.com, The Economic Times, American City Business Journals, and Miami Herald.

Early life 
Hulse was born in Illinois on October 19, 1954, and reared in Ottawa, Illinois. His father, also Carl E. Hulse Sr., was a plumbing contractor after World War II, and his mother worked in their home after trying other work.  In 1976, he received an undergraduate degree in Mass Communications from the School of Communication of the Illinois State University, where as a student he was a news editor for The Vidette.  In 2007, the newspaper admitted him to The Vidette Hall of Fame.  Ten years later, in 2017, the Schools College of Arts and Sciences elected him to its Hall of Fame.

Career 
Immediately after his college graduation, he worked for the News Tribune in LaSalle, Illinois-Peru, Illinois. Before relocating to Washington DC in 1985, he spent the early years of his career working at newspapers in Illinois and Florida, The Daily Journal in Kankakee, Illinois, and the Sun-Sentinel in Fort Lauderdale, Florida.

In 1985 he began working at the Washington, D.C. bureau of The New York Times and covered its regional editions, first as night editor working the 3 p.m. to midnight shift.  He began covering Capitol Hill in May 2002.  From 2011 to 2014, he became Washington Editor for The Times, coordinating its Washington coverage of the White House and executive branch, Congress, the courts, and the Pentagon.  For more than a decade he had served as the paper's Chief Congressional Correspondent.  

He appears occasionally on PBS's Washington Week on Friday evenings.

Personal life 
He lives in Washington with his wife, Kimberly Hamer Hulse, a longtime National Geographic employee.  They have two grown sons, Nicolas and Benjamin.

He declares no political party.  Hulse is in a local band called the Native Makers, where he plays drums, maraca, and other percussion instruments; they have written a song called "This Town." and do musical entertainment on ocean cruises.

References

External links 

 Twitter account for Carl Hulse
 New York Times profile for Carl Hulse
 MuckRack profile for Carl Hulse, including a list of his articles
 PBS profile for Carl Hulse

1954 births
Living people
American political journalists
Illinois Independents
Illinois State University alumni
Journalists from Illinois
The New York Times people
People from Ottawa, Illinois